Satisfact is the eponymous second studio album by American post-punk band Satisfact. Co-produced by John Goodmanson, it was released on March 18, 1997 through K Records.

The album features a continuation of the band's trademark post-punk sound of "screechy guitar sounds, hypnotic keyboard effects, robotic rhythms and monotone vocals."

Critical reception

AllMusic critic Mike DaRanco wrote "Suave, laid-back and borderline poppy (but not in the obnoxiously happy sort of way), Satisfact have the ability to accomplish all of this without coming close to boring the listener to death." DaRanco further stated: "They even manage to successfully incorporate a theremin on the track "Demonstration"—that alone is worth giving this record a good review."

Track listing
 "Misprint" – 3:01
 "Demonstration" – 2:39
 "How Things Work" – 3:05
 "Are You Gifted" – 3:16
 "Building Tall Buildings" – 2:02
 "Relay This" – 4:19
 "Perfect Sleeper" – 2:28
 "Moods For Moderns" – 1:36
 "Accent the Motion" – 2:43
 "Four Sided" – 8:00
 "Untitled" – 0:48

Personnel
Album personnel as adapted from album liner notes.

 Matt Steinke – vocals, guitar
 Josh Warren – bass
 Chad States – synthesizer
 Jeremiah Green – percussion
 Satisfact – production, photography
 John Goodmanson – production, recording
 Steve Fisk – theremin (2)
 T. Z. Deen – artwork
 James Bertram – photography

References

External links
 

1997 albums
K Records albums
Albums produced by John Goodmanson
Satisfact albums